"Runnin' (Dying to Live)", is a posthumous song by American rapper 2Pac, with an additional posthumous verse from The Notorious B.I.G. It was released as the first single from the soundtrack album Tupac: Resurrection on September 30, 2003.

Produced by Eminem, the song uses The Notorious B.I.G.'s vocals from a 1994 recording known as "Runnin' from tha Police", one of the few collaborations recorded by 2Pac and The Notorious B.I.G. during their lifetimes. 2Pac's vocals are taken from a re-recorded version intended for Thug Life's only studio album Thug Life: Vol. 1 that was later scrapped due to the feud between both artists.

The song peaked at #19 for the week of December 20, 2003 on the Billboard Hot 100, becoming one of 2Pac's highest charting songs and his second most successful posthumous release as a lead artist.

Overview
The song is a remake of an Easy Mo Bee-produced song called "Runnin' from tha Police", recorded by Tupac Shakur and Notorious B.I.G. in 1994. Easy Mo Bee subsequently received songwriting credits on "Runnin' (Dying To Live)".

The chorus is from Edgar Winter's song "Dying to Live" (from the album Edgar Winter's White Trash), which was edited to a higher pitch for the song. The interview of Notorious B.I.G. heard at the end of the track was recorded only a few weeks before his death.

Music video
The video contains interviews of both Tupac and Notorious B.I.G. It is the only song from the album to feature a music video. The video version mutes all language, violence and drug references, even Biggie's comment about two cops being shot (the radio version only censors all profanity except the word "bitches" in 2Pac's verse).  In the video, it has past images and videos of 2Pac and Biggie, and once their verses end, the song fades out.

Awards and nominations

Track listing
Credits adapted from the single's liner notes.

Notes
 signifies a remixer.
"Runnin' (Dying to Live)" and "Still Ballin" were originally produced by Easy Mo Bee and Johnny "J", respectively.

Charts

Weekly charts

Year-end charts

References

2003 singles
2003 songs
Tupac Shakur songs
The Notorious B.I.G. songs
Songs released posthumously
Song recordings produced by Eminem
Songs written by the Notorious B.I.G.
Songs written by Tupac Shakur
Gangsta rap songs
Songs written by Easy Mo Bee
Songs written by Eminem
Songs written by Luis Resto (musician)
Songs about death